The Scrapper is a 1922 American silent drama film directed by Hobart Henley and starring Herbert Rawlinson, Gertrude Olmstead and William Welsh.

Cast
 Herbert Rawlinson as Malloy
 Gertrude Olmstead as Eileen McCarthy
 William Welsh as Dan McCarthy
 Frankie Lee as The Kid
 Hal Craig as Speed Cop
 George A. McDaniel as 	McGuirk 
 Fred Kohler as Oleson
 Edward Jobson as Riley
 Albert MacQuarrie as Simms 
 Walter Perry as Rapport

References

Bibliography
 Connelly, Robert B. The Silents: Silent Feature Films, 1910-36, Volume 40, Issue 2. December Press, 1998.
 Munden, Kenneth White. The American Film Institute Catalog of Motion Pictures Produced in the United States, Part 1. University of California Press, 1997.

External links
 

1922 films
1922 drama films
1920s English-language films
American silent feature films
Silent American drama films
Films directed by Hobart Henley
American black-and-white films
Universal Pictures films
1920s American films
English-language drama films